The 1976 Big League World Series took place from August 14–21 in Fort Lauderdale, Florida, United States. Taipei, Taiwan defeated host Broward County, Florida in the championship game. It was Taiwan's third straight championship.

Teams

Results

References

Big League World Series
Big League World Series